From Resistance to Independence is a political book written in French by communist leader and Yugoslavia's leader Josip Broz Tito. It was first published by Anthropos in 1977.

References 

Josip Broz Tito
Political books
1977 non-fiction books
French-language books